Kazanka is a rural locality (a village) in Tenyayevsky Selsoviet, Fyodorovsky District, Bashkortostan, Russia. The population was 2 as of 2010. There is 1 street.

Geography 
Kazanka is located 21 km north of Fyodorovka (the district's administrative centre) by road. Orlovka is the nearest rural locality.

References 

Rural localities in Fyodorovsky District